Asmodeus: Book of Angels Volume 7 is an album by Marc Ribot performing compositions from John Zorn's second Masada book, The Book of Angels.

Reception

The Allmusic review by awarded the album 4½ stars, stating, "On this thrilling, amped-up outing, six-string wizard Marc Ribot plays the compositions of John Zorn with beautiful intensity... The ghosts of Jimi Hendrix and Sonny Sharrock hover in Ribot's playing here: this is ensemble avant-rock made for and by the courageous".

Writing for All About Jazz, Troy Collins commented, "Asmodeus: The Book of Angels, Volume 7 is the most visceral exploration of the Masada songbook yet... A high water mark in a developing series, Asmodeus sets the bar higher for future interpretations of this rich body of work".

Track listing
All compositions by John Zorn
 "Kalmiya" – 4:41 
 "Yezriel" – 7:26
 "Kezef" – 2:32
 "Mufgar" – 2:58
 "Armaros" – 4:52
 "Cabriel" – 2:00
 "Zakun" – 3:38
 "Raziel" – 2:24
 "Dagiel" – 3:22
 "Sensenya" – 4:37

Personnel
Marc Ribot – guitar  
Trevor Dunn – bass 
G. Calvin Weston – drums
John Zorn – composer, conductor

References

External links

2005 albums
Albums produced by John Zorn
Book of Angels albums
Tzadik Records albums
Marc Ribot albums